Clare High School is a secondary school located at 201 E. State St. in Clare, Michigan, United States.

Demographics
Clare High School is 92% White, 2% Black, 2% Asian, 4% Hispanic. In recent years Clare High School has seen an increase in racial diversity with immigrants coming from Asia, Europe, and Latin America.
Some countries represented in the school are
China,
Bolivia,
Mexico,
Poland,
Germany,
Russia,
Italy,
Myanmar (Burma),
Canada,
Dominican Republic.

 Currently 38% percent of the school's population receives free or reduced lunch.
 53% is boys and 47% is girls

Athletics
Some sports that Clare High offers are soccer, baseball, basketball, volleyball, football, bowling, track and field, cross country running, golf, wrestling, skiing, and marching band. Clare has been a member of the Jack Pine Conference since 1982.

JPC Championships 

*MHSAA Runner up

Rivals
Clare's biggest rival is Farwell High School in Farwell

Notable alumni
Gloria Sickal Gaither - composer of Christian music; member of the Bill Gaither Trio
Debbie Stabenow - United States Senator from Michigan since 2001.

References

Schools in Clare County, Michigan
Educational institutions established in 1903
Public high schools in Michigan
1903 establishments in Michigan